The Pittsburgh Maulers were a team that competed in the 1984 season of the United States Football League. Their most prominent player was first pick overall in the 1984 USFL Draft, running back Mike Rozier of Nebraska, who won the Heisman Trophy, collegiate football's most prestigious individual award.

They were owned by shopping mall magnate Edward J. DeBartolo, Sr., the father of Edward J. DeBartolo, Jr., then-owner of the San Francisco 49ers of the National Football League and the Pittsburgh Penguins of the National Hockey League. The Maulers played at Three Rivers Stadium.

History

No one was surprised when two groups filed for a Pittsburgh franchise in the winter of 1983. It did come as a considerable surprise that DeBartolo, Sr. was one of them, given his son's ownership of the 49ers. However, while the other group contented itself with holding a rally to demonstrate support for a potential franchise, DeBartolo stole a march by securing an all-important lease for Three Rivers Stadium. A few days later, DeBartolo's longtime right-hand man, former Steeler Paul Martha, informed the other owners and Commissioner Chet Simmons that his boss was not only applying for a franchise, but already had a lease.

There was some debate over whether to approve DeBartolo's bid, with some fearing that they were effectively allowing an NFL owner into their circle. It was an open secret that Eddie, Sr. and Eddie, Jr. worked closely together. Ultimately, the owners realized that DeBartolo would lend the upstart league instant credibility and unanimously approved his bid, making him the first owner of a USFL expansion team.  Unusually, DeBartolo applied for the franchise in his own name, rather than setting up a corporation or partnership. He also paid the full $6.25 million expansion fee up front. A name-the-team contest yielded the nickname "Maulers," after the sledgehammer-wielding workers in steel foundries.

The NFL itself threatened an investigation over a possible Cleveland Spiders-style conflict of interest due to the father owning a USFL team and the son owning an NFL team, an accusation both father and son insisted was not the case. Ultimately, the NFL asked Eddie, Jr. to leave the room during any USFL discussions.

DeBartolo immediately made waves by beginning talks with Dan Marino, a Pittsburgh native and the quarterback for the hometown Pitt Panthers (he ultimately signed with the NFL's Miami Dolphins). Joe Pendry, the offensive coordinator for the 1983 finalist Philadelphia Stars, became head coach.

The Maulers opened their home season with a March 11, 1984 sellout crowd at Three Rivers Stadium facing the Birmingham Stallions, a team led by Cliff Stoudt, who had spent much of the previous season as the starter for the Pittsburgh Steelers, and had been Terry Bradshaw's backup for years before then.  Fans bombarded Stoudt with snowballs and ice whenever the Stallions entered the red zone. The Maulers lost, 30-18, in what would be the team's only sellout.

The team finished 3–15, tying the Washington Federals for the worst record in the league.  However, while undermanned, they were not nearly as bad as their record indicated.  They were in part victims of a very tough schedule.  They played nine games against playoff teams and caught a lot of the other teams when they were hot—Oklahoma and New Orleans early and San Antonio and Jacksonville late. Seven of their losses were by fewer than 10 points.

The team was built around the idea that Dallas Cowboys longtime third-string QB Glenn Carano would be a strong starter in the USFL.  To support Carano, the team had RB Mike Rozier–the second straight Heisman Trophy winner to sign with a USFL team–and WR Greg Anderson, who caught 63 passes.  Carano had his moments but he struggled overall, completing only 53.7% of his passes with 13 touchdowns and 19 interceptions.  Backup Tom Rozantz was expected to mostly carry a clipboard, but he ended up playing a lot and he struggled as well.  However, either would have been a disappointment, as most fans expected the Maulers to pick Steve Young rather than Mike Rozier.  Even bringing in former Arizona Wranglers star WR Jackie Flowers did not turn around the offense.  The defense, led by CB Jerry Holmes and DE Sam Clancy finished a respectable eighth in points allowed.  In spite of this, they were hobbled by a low-octane offense.

In the middle of a 17-7 loss to the Memphis Showboats, DeBartolo told general manager George Heddleston to tell Pendry to yank Carano in favor of backup Tom Rozantz. Pendry refused to do so, even when Carano dislocated his right arm and could not throw without "tremendous pain" shooting through it. A fuming DeBartolo ordered Heddleston and Pendry to meet with him at his office in Youngstown, Ohio the next morning. Pendry refused to come, and quit rather than be fired. Offensive line coach Ellis Rainsberger took over as interim coach for the rest of the season.

They closed the season against Jacksonville in a torrential rainstorm; one sideline was so badly flooded that both teams had to share the other sideline.

Vote for a fall schedule kills franchise

Despite losing millions of dollars and only winning three games, the Maulers were competitive in most games. They also attracted 22,858 per game, a respectable figure—at least by USFL standards—for an expansion team. DeBartolo was determined to stick it out, even going as far as hiring Hank Bullough away from the Green Bay Packers to become the new head coach. The fan support in such a strong sports town such as Pittsburgh can be attributed to a combination of factors. At the time the Maulers arrived, the Steelers were in the middle of an on-field decline following their 1970s dominance. The Penguins were all but invisible in the Pittsburgh market (though the team had just drafted Mario Lemieux). The Pittsburgh Pirates were experiencing an on- and off-field collapse that would be topped off by the 1985 Pittsburgh drug trials and the team nearly relocating to Denver.

However, just a few days after Bullough's hiring, the USFL voted to switch to a fall schedule in 1986.  DeBartolo was a strong believer in the USFL's original spring football concept, and he knew the Maulers could not hope to go head-to-head against the Steelers. Sharing Three Rivers Stadium would have caused serious logistical problems early in the fall, with the Maulers, Pirates and Steelers fighting for dates. A move to Cleveland, closer to DeBartolo's home in Youngstown, was quickly ruled out; even without the daunting task of going head-to-head with the Cleveland Browns (then a solid playoff team) to consider, similar conflicts with the Cleveland Indians sharing Cleveland Stadium at the time rendered this potential move impractical as well.

As a result, just a week after the vote to move to the fall, DeBartolo decided to fold the team without so much as a press conference. He announced that he intended to merge the Maulers with another team. Initially, he struck a merger agreement with the Stars, who had been forced to move to Baltimore after concluding they could not compete with the NFL's Eagles. However, just months later, at the urging of his wife Marie, DeBartolo sold his stake in the Stars and got out of the league entirely. The league's abandonment of Pittsburgh was later cited as a factor in the USFL failing to secure a large judgment in its antitrust suit against the NFL; although it technically won, the jury only awarded it $3 in damages.

Amidst several USFL teams that were "one-season wonders" as a result of relocating, merging with other teams and/or changing team names (all off-season), the Pittsburgh Maulers have the distinction of being the only USFL team to play with no connections to any other cities or teams, neither before nor after their only season.

1984 Pittsburgh Maulers schedule 

Sources

Players of note

Complete roster

Duplicate numbers listed due to roster movement during the season
-- = roster number information unavailable

All-USFL players 
The following Maulers players have been named to All-USFL Teams:
CB Jerry Holmes

Statistics and records

Season-by-season record

Note: The Finish, Wins, Losses, and Ties columns list regular season results and exclude any postseason play.

Records

References

External links
 Remember The USFL: Pittsburgh Maulers
 USFL.info - Pittsburgh Maulers
 Our Sports Central: Pittsburgh Maulers
 Steeler Chief: Pittsburgh Maulers

 
1983 establishments in Pennsylvania
1984 disestablishments in Pennsylvania